Nathalie Boltt (born 19 July 1973) is a South African actress, director and writer known for Riverdale and District 9. Her initial break into acting was in her birth country, South Africa, as Joey Ortlepp on the SABC 3 drama Isidingo from 2001 to 2004. She directs television and film; and portrays Penelope Blossom in The CW’s teen drama series Riverdale since 2017. She is a graduate of Rhodes University, and currently lives in Vancouver, Canada and Los Angeles.

Internationally, Boltt has been seen in the film District 9, 24 Hours To Live, Inspector George Gently, The Astronauts and the 2005 television remake The Poseidon Adventure. She also voices many characters, including of DottyWot in the New Zealand children's series The WotWots.

Filmography

Film

Television

Web

References

External links
Official website

1973 births
Living people
White South African people
South African television actresses
South African film actresses
Rhodes University alumni
South African emigrants to New Zealand
People from Johannesburg